Megacalanidae is a family of copepods belonging to the order Calanoida.

Genera:
 Bathycalanus Sars, 1905
 Bradycalanus Scott, 1909
 Elenacalanus Bradford-Grieve, Blanco-Bercial & Boxshall, 2017
 Megacalanus Wolfenden, 1904

References

Copepods